Jaime Andrés Grondona Bobadilla (born 15 April 1987) is a Chilean footballer who currently plays for Primera Divisió club FC Santa Coloma as striker.

Career
In 2020, he came to Andorra and joined Atlètic d'Escaldes thanks of former Chilean goalkeeper Guillermo Burgos, who worked in the technical staff of the club.

Titles

International
 Chile
FIFA U-20 World Cup:Third place: 2007

References

1987 births
Living people
Chilean footballers
Chile under-20 international footballers
Chile international footballers
Chilean Primera División players
Santiago Wanderers footballers
O'Higgins F.C. footballers
Santiago Morning footballers
Deportes La Serena footballers
Ñublense footballers
Cobreloa footballers
Cobresal footballers
Puerto Montt footballers
San Marcos de Arica footballers
San Luis de Quillota footballers
Club Deportivo Palestino footballers
Deportes Iquique footballers
Sportspeople from Valparaíso
Association football forwards
Expatriate footballers in Andorra
Chilean expatriate footballers
Chilean expatriate sportspeople in Andorra
Primera Divisió players
FC Santa Coloma players
Atlètic Club d'Escaldes players